USS Notable is a name used more than once by the U.S. Navy:

  was laid down 17 September 1943 by the Gulf Shipbuilding Corp., Chickasaw, Alabama.
  was laid down 8 June 1953 by Higgins Inc., New Orleans, Louisiana.

References 

United States Navy ship names